José Guillermo Santiago Guzmán (September 4, 1928 – October 9, 2018), better known by the nickname "Pantalones", was a Puerto Rican professional baseball pitcher who played in Major League Baseball between 1954 and 1956 for the Cleveland Indians (–) and Kansas City Athletics. In the Negro leagues, he played for the New York Cubans from 1947 to 1948.

Playing career
During his three MLB trials, Santiago posted a 3–2 record with 29 strikeouts and a 4.66 ERA in 27 appearances, including five starts and 56 innings of work, allowing 67 hits and 33 bases on balls. His entire pro career encompassed 13 years, 1947–1959, with two years in the Negro leagues and 11 in minor league baseball.

In 2003, Santiago was inducted into the Caribbean Baseball Hall of Fame.

After baseball
In the 1970s, Santiago became a boxing promoter in Puerto Rico. A believer in Puerto Rican Independence, Santiago, like his friend Fufi Santori, owned a technically possible, Puerto Rican passport, in his case numbered #001261, since 1997.

See also
 List of Negro league baseball players who played in Major League Baseball
1957 Caribbean Series
Players from Puerto Rico in Major League Baseball

References
 
Rene A. Santiago Fuentes (Son)
 Jose Santiago baseball statistics by Baseball Almanac

External links
 and Seamheads
Retrosheet

1928 births
2018 deaths
Buffalo Bisons (minor league) players
Cleveland Indians players
Columbus Jets players
Dallas Eagles players
Dayton Indians players
Havana Sugar Kings players
Indianapolis Indians players
Kansas City Athletics players
Major League Baseball pitchers
Major League Baseball players from Puerto Rico
New York Cubans players
People from Coamo, Puerto Rico
Puerto Rican independence activists
San Antonio Missions players
San Diego Padres (minor league) players
Wilkes-Barre Indians players
Puerto Rican expatriate baseball players in Cuba